Joel Bennett (born January 31, 1970) is an American former professional baseball pitcher, who played in Major League Baseball (MLB) from  to . He batted and threw right-handed.

Bennett was drafted by the Boston Red Sox in the 21st round of the 1991 amateur draft.

Bennett currently teaches physical education at Windsor Central Middle School in Windsor, New York. He also coaches JV Baseball, as well as varsity Golf for Windsor Central High School.

External links

Joel Bennett at Baseball Almanac

1970 births
Living people
Major League Baseball pitchers
East Stroudsburg Warriors baseball players
Baseball players from New York (state)
Philadelphia Phillies players
Winter Haven Red Sox players
Baltimore Orioles players
New Jersey Jackals players
Newburgh Night Hawks players
Sportspeople from Binghamton, New York
Bowie Baysox players
Elmira Pioneers players
Gulf Coast Red Sox players
Lynchburg Red Sox players
New Britain Red Sox players
Pawtucket Red Sox players
Rochester Red Wings players
Scranton/Wilkes-Barre Red Barons players
Trenton Thunder players